Allochlorodes is a genus of moths in the family Geometridae described by Prout in 1917.

References

Geometrinae
Geometridae genera